Lehota is a village and municipality in the Nitra District in western central Slovakia, in the Nitra Region.

History
In historical records the village was first mentioned in 1308.

Geography
The village lies at an altitude of 160 metres and covers an area of 11.005 km². It has a population of about 1804 people.

Ethnicity
The village is approximately 99% Slovak.

Facilities
The village has a public library and football pitch.
It also has a multifunctional playground.

See also
 Krvavé Šenky

References

External links
https://web.archive.org/web/20080111223415/http://www.statistics.sk/mosmis/eng/run.html

Villages and municipalities in Nitra District